= Aristate =

Aristate means having a spiny or bristly tip and may refer to:

- An antenna shape
- Aristate (botany), a leaf shape
